Matthäus Wieser (1617–1678) was a collector and songwriter of work songs, often for miners. He was sometimes known as Matthai Wieser.

Life 
Born in 1617 in Graslitz (Kraslice, near Hof), he lived later in Freiberg (Freiberg, and was last located in Germany). He died in 1678.

He was a miner and a songwriter (Bergsänger).

Miner-singers were miners who were deeply Christian. Other minersingers were Michael Bauer and Christian Gottlieb Lohse (1712–1754). 

It is early work poetry and songwriting.

Works 
Christian songs for Miners 
O Bergwerksschöpfer höchster Gott
Mit Freude will ich heben an
Dem höchsten Gott so viel ich kann
Freut euch sehr ihr Bergleut alle (from: Gesangbuch der luth. Landeskirche)
Matthai Wiesers Geistlicher Brunqvell (Spiritual Water well)

He also collected songs

Other miner songs of unknown authorship 
Gott, der du Berg und Hügel 
Gnädigster Erbarmer

References 

1617 births
1678 deaths
Work music
German songwriters
Song collectors
17th-century German musicians